INS Vikramaditya (Sanskrit:) is a modified  and the flagship of the Indian Navy. She entered into service in 2013. 

Originally built as Baku and commissioned in 1987, the carrier served with the Soviet Navy and later with the Russian Navy (as Admiral Gorshkov) before being decommissioned in 1996. The carrier was invested by India on 20 January 2004 after years of negotiations at a final arms sales price of $2.35 billion. The transformed ship completed her sea trials in July 2013 and first STOBAR aviation trials in September 2013.

She was commissioned on 16 November 2013 at a ceremony held at Severodvinsk, Russia. On 14 June 2014, the Prime Minister of India, Narendra Modi, formally inducted INS Vikramaditya into the Indian Navy and dedicated her to the nation.

History

The deal
Baku entered service in 1987, renamed Admiral Gorshkov in 1991, but was deactivated in 1996 because she was too expensive to operate on a post-Cold War budget. This attracted the attention of India, which was looking for a way to expand its carrier aviation capabilities. On 20 January 2004, after years of negotiations, Russia and India signed a deal for the sale of the ship. The ship would be free, while India would pay US$800 million for the upgrade and refit of the vessel and an additional US$1 billion for the aircraft and weapons systems. The navy looked at equipping the carrier with the E-2C Hawkeye but decided not to. In 2009, Northrop Grumman offered the advanced E-2D Hawkeye to the Indian Navy.

The deal also included the purchase of 12 single-seat Mikoyan MiG-29K 'Fulcrum-D' (Product 9.41) and four dual-seat MiG-29KUB aircraft (with an option for 14 more aircraft) at US$1 billion, six Kamov Ka-31 "Helix" reconnaissance and anti-submarine helicopters, torpedo tubes, missile systems and artillery units. Facilities and procedures for training pilots and technical staff, delivery of simulators, spare parts, and establishment maintenance on Indian Navy facilities were also part of the contract.

The upgrade involved stripping all the weaponry and missile launcher tubes from the ship's foredeck to make way for a "short take-off but arrested recovery" (STOBAR) configuration, converting the Gorshkov from a hybrid carrier/cruiser to a pure carrier.

The announced delivery date for INS Vikramaditya was August 2008, allowing the carrier to enter service just as the Indian Navy's only light carrier INS Viraat retired. While Viraat'''s retirement had been pushed out to 2010–2012, she underwent a final refit, enabling her to serve through 2016.

The delay issues were compounded by ongoing cost overruns, leading to high-level diplomatic exchanges. India finally agreed to pay an additional US$1.2 billion for the project, doubling the original cost. However, ongoing difficulty with Vikramaditya's delivery schedule pushed the expected delivery to 2013. Also, the indigenous Vikrant-class aircraft carrier was delayed by at least a year and was expected to be commissioned in 2013 from the proposed 2012.

In July 2008, it was reported that Russia needed to increase the price by about US$2 billion, blaming unexpected cost overruns on the deteriorated condition of the ship and citing a "market price" for a new mid-size carrier of US$3–4 bn. India had paid US$400 million as of November 2008. However, Russia threatened to cancel the deal entirely if India did not pay the increased amount. In December 2008, government sources in India stated that the Cabinet Committee on Security (CCS) had finally decided in favour of purchasing Admiral Gorshkov as the best option available. The Comptroller and Auditor General of India (CAG) criticised the fact that Vikramaditya would be a second-hand warship with a limited lifespan, which would be 60% costlier than a new one. Also, there was a risk of further delay in its delivery.
The Indian Navy Chief of Naval Staff, Admiral Sureesh Mehta, defended the price for the warship, saying, "I can't comment on the CAG. But you all are defence analysts, can you get me an aircraft carrier for less than USD 2 billion? If you can, I am going to sign a cheque right now".

The statement from the Chief of Naval Staff at that time indicated that the final deal could be over US$2 billion. When asked about CAG's finding that the navy had not done its risk analysis before going in for the ship, he was quoted as saying, "I can ensure you that there is no such thing. There is no question, we have been looking at the ship since the late 90s."

On 7 December 2009, Russian sources indicated that final terms had been agreed on, but no delivery date was set. On 8 December 2009, it was reported that India and Russia ended the stalemate over Admiral Gorshkov price deal by agreeing on a price of US$2.2 billion. Moscow asked for US$2.9 billion for the aircraft carrier, nearly three times that was originally agreed between the two sides in 2004. On the other hand, New Delhi wanted the price to be scaled back to US$2.1 billion. Both governments finalised the price of Admiral Gorshkov at US$2.35 billion on 10 March, a day ahead of Russian Prime Minister Vladimir Putin's two-day visit to India.

In April 2010, a scandal over the project emerged when it was announced that a senior Indian Navy officer had probably been blackmailed in order to influence the negotiations over the cost of Admiral Gorshkov to India. Commodore Sukhjinder Singh had been a senior figure supervising the refit of the carrier, working as the principal director for the project. He was discharged from service due to this incident.

Remodeling

The hull work was completed by 2008, and Vikramaditya was launched on 4 December 2008. Around 99% of the structural work and almost 50% of the cabling work had been completed by June 2010. Nearly all of the large equipment, including engines and diesel generators, was installed. A naval MiG-29K prototype aircraft was used to test the deck systems of Vikramaditya in 2010.

All reconfiguration work was completed at Severodvinsk, Russia. However, it was delayed by three years due to an underestimation of the amount of cabling needed. An expert-level discussion on technical and financial matters was held between India and Russia to resolve the issues. The MiG-29K entered operational service with India in February 2010. A compromise was finalised, and India was to pay an extra undisclosed amount. Russia was to install new systems instead of repairing the old ones.

On 1 June 2010, The Times of India reported a naval officer saying: "With India earlier this year agreeing to the revised refit cost of $2.33 billion for Gorshkov after three years of bitter wrangling since the earlier agreement inked in January 2004 had earmarked only $974 million for it, Russia has appointed a high-level apex committee to oversee the work on the carrier". The ship was to go for harbour trials by early 2011 to ensure she could be handed over to India by around December 2012. Dock trials began on 1 March 2011. These trials focused on the main power generation units and the radio-electronic armament systems, manufactured in India. Indian Navy personnel began training on Vikramaditya in April 2011. On 19 April 2012, it was announced that all internal systems were functioning, and the ship was entirely self-contained. The ship's magnetic field and centre of gravity were measured before sea trials began.

New design

As completed, Vikramaditya has a larger full load displacement than when the ship was originally launched in 1982 as Baku. 1,750 out of 2,500 compartments of the vessel were re-fabricated, and extensive re-cabling was done to support new radars and sensors. The elevators were upgraded, and two restraining stands were fitted, allowing combat aircraft to reach full power before making a ski jump-assisted short take-off. Three arresting gears were fitted on the aft of the angled deck, and navigation and carrier-landing aids were added to support fixed-wing "short take-off but arrested recovery" (STOBAR) operations.

Structural modifications

The major modifications were to allow Admiral Gorshkov to operate as a STOBAR aircraft carrier in Indian service, as opposed to the STOVL configuration the ship was built as. This involved removal of all the armament, including the P-500 Bazalt cruise missile launchers and the four Antey Kinzhal surface-to-air missile bins fitted on the ship's bow, to make way for a 14.3°, full-width ski-jump. The 20-ton capacity aircraft lift beside the ship's island superstructure was unchanged, but the aft lift was enlarged, and its lift capacity increased to 30 tons. For STOBAR operations, three 30 m arrestor wires and three restraining gears on the stern of the angled deck were equipped. Sponsons were installed to increase flight deck area, allow the ski-jump to be fitted, for strengthening of arresting gear and runway area, and to lengthen the after end, which allowed an increase to the length of the landing strip aft of the arresting gear. 234 new hull sections were installed to achieve the desired shape, and the total steel added to carry out these modifications amounted to 2500 tons.

The superstructure profile was designed to accommodate the fixed phased array scanners of the Soviet Navy's Mars-Passat 3D air search radar system, along with extensive command and control facilities to conduct an aerial campaign. Extensive revamp of sensors was carried out, with long-range air-surveillance radars and advanced electronic warfare suites fitted, which enable the maintenance of a surveillance bubble of over 500 km around the ship. An aft mast was installed to accommodate various communication antennae. These changes needed 2,300 km of new cables and 3,000 km of new pipes.

The eight original boilers were replaced by new generation, high-pressure boilers, converted to take diesel fuel utilising LSHSD instead of furnace fuel oil, each providing a steam capacity of 100 tonnes per hour. The new boilers are highly efficient and have high levels of automation. Six turbo alternators and six diesel alternators generate 18 MW of electricity to power various equipment. Modern oil-water separators, as well as a sewage treatment plant, were incorporated to meet international standards. Six new Finnish Wärtsilä 1.5 MW diesel generators, a Global Marine communications system, Sperry Bridgemaster navigation radar, a new telephone exchange, new data link and an IFF Mk XI system were added. Residential services were improved with the addition of two reverse osmosis plants producing 400 tons of fresh water per day, as well as updated refrigeration and air conditioning. A new galley was installed with improved domestic services and accommodation for 10 female officers.

Combat systems

The combat systems on board the carrier are controlled by LESORUB-E, the computer-aided action information system. It gathers data from the ship's sensors and data links and creates comprehensive situational awareness. The CCS Mk II communication complex is installed for external communications and the Link II tactical data system enables integration into the Indian Navy's network-centric operations. Modern launch and recovery systems are installed for handling different aircraft – the LUNA landing system for MiG-29Ks and the DAPS Landing system for Sea Harriers. The Resistor-E automated air-traffic control system has been installed, which assists with approach, landing and short-range navigation down to a distance of 30 metres short of the flight deck to the pilots. Along with various other sub-systems, it provides navigation and flight data to ship-borne aircraft operating at long distances from the carrier.

When delivered, Vikramaditya had yet to be fitted with any onboard armament, leaving her dependent on her battle group for self-defence. This was rectified during the ship's short refit of April–June 2015, when she was fitted with four license-built AK-630 CIWS and a Barak 1 SAM system stripped from the decommissioned . During the ship's first scheduled major refit in 2017, the Barak 1 system will be replaced with the newly developed Barak 8 long-range air-defence system (LR-SAM), which is currently being tested. It is launched from vertical launch cells and has an operational range of 0.5–100 km. The carrier will carry up to 48 missiles.

The official expected life span of the ship is 40 years, and she is unlikely to require any major repair work for at least a decade. Over 70% of the vessel and her equipment is new, and the remainder has been refurbished. Sevmash Shipyard, which upgraded the carrier, will provide warranty servicing, including maintenance for the next 20 years.

Air GroupVikramaditya has been designed as a STOBAR carrier capable of operating both conventional fixed-wing aircraft and helicopters, with up to 34 aircraft capable of being accommodated. Its primary embarked aircraft type is the Mikoyan MiG-29K, a navalised version of the Mikoyan MiG-29M. The MiG-29K is an advanced, all-weather multi-role fighter capable of undertaking both the fleet air defence, low-level strike and anti-shipping roles. The primary ASW platform is the venerable Westland Sea King, while the Kamov Ka-31 undertakes AEW. Carriage ranges given for the ship seem to converge around 16–24 MiG-29K and 10 Kamov Ka-31 or Dhruv helicopters; however, Vikramaditya cannot operate fixed-wing AEW aircraft owing to her configuration as a STOBAR carrier. Utility and plane guard duties are undertaken by the HAL Chetak (or HAL Dhruv).

Sea trials and commissioning

First sea trials

Russia was scheduled to hand over Vikramaditya to India on 4 December 2012, with sea trials scheduled to begin on 29 May 2012. The sea trials began on 8 June. The ship sailed out for pre-delivery trials from the berth of the Sevmash shipyard in Russia's northern city of Severodvinsk. These trials were to include landing and take-off of fighter jets from the deck of the carrier.

On 17 September 2012, malfunctions were detected during trials. According to an official report, seven out of eight steam boilers of the propulsion machinery were out of order. Due to this, the deadline to hand over this ship to the Indian Navy was postponed again until October 2013. Later investigation has determined that the cause of the engine failure was poor workmanship and supervision. The Gorshkov and other ships of the 1143.4 class had a history of multiple boiler failures; however, Russian shipbuilders claimed that the problem was the low-grade Chinese-made fire bricks bought by the Indian Navy that were used in the boiler insulation instead of asbestos.

Second sea trials
On 3 July 2013, Igor Sevastyanov, deputy head of Russia's state arms exporter Rosoboronexport, announced that the warship had departed for sea trials with a mix of Russian and Indian crew. On 28 July 2013, it was reported that Vikramaditya had successfully completed her sea trials and was able to reach her maximum speed of 32 knots. She then proceeded to the White Sea for aviation trials, carried out by Russia's Northern Fleet aviation and completed in September 2013. Aircraft and helicopters flew around and over the ship to check the performance of its radar, air defence, communication and control systems, and MiG specialists praised the ski-jump ramp.

The sea trials lasted three months. In total, the ship sailed for  during both trials, controlled 778 aircraft and helicopter flights, and conducted 88 landings by Russian pilots.

Surveillance by NATO
During sea trials, a Lockheed P-3 Orion patrol aircraft observed Vikramaditya. While in international waters, it flew close to the ship to take photographs and dropped sonobuoys to record the ship's acoustic signature. The aircraft left the area when a Russian MiG-29 fighter arrived. A Norwegian ship was also seen to observe Vikramaditya.

Commissioning

The ship was formally commissioned on 16 November 2013 at a ceremony held at Severodvinsk, Russia. The ceremony was attended by the then-Indian defence minister A. K. Antony and the Russian deputy prime minister Dmitry Rogozin.

Service history

She was under the command of Commodore Suraj Berry, her first Indian captain. Apart from her Indian crew, she also carried 177 Russian specialists from Sevmash, who would remain on board for one year, as part of the 20-year post-warranty services contract with the shipyard. During the journey, she encountered a storm in the Barents Sea, where she linked up with her escorts frigate  and fleet tanker . The group was escorted by the Royal Navy frigate  while passing through the English Channel and was joined by destroyer  near Gibraltar.
The flotilla sailed in the Mediterranean Sea, passed through the Suez Canal and entered the Arabian Sea near the Gulf of Aden on 1 January 2014. It was composed of the aircraft carrier , two s, three s, the frigate , and a couple of offshore patrol vessels, including . The event was significant as the Indian Navy operated two aircraft carriers simultaneously for the first time in 20 years. After conducting basic sea exercises with the fleet, Vikramaditya reached Karwar on 7 January 2014.

Navy pilots of INAS 303 "Black Panthers" operating the MiG-29K practised carrier operations at the shore-based test facility (SBTF) in INS Hansa, Dabolim, Vasco-da-Gama. The first aircraft piloted by an Indian Navy pilot landed on the carrier on 8 February 2014. Since then, the pilots and air controllers have been certified to operate the MiG-29K fighters from the carrier deck, including night landings. The carrier's air wing will consist of 16 MiG-29Ks, including four KUB trainers, six airborne early warning and control (AEW&C) Kamov Ka-31 and Kamov Ka-28 anti-submarine warfare (ASW) helicopters.

In May 2014, the carrier was declared operationally deployed along with its embarked air group comprising MiG-29Ks and had taken part in a war game conducted by the Western Naval Command. On 14 June 2014, the Prime Minister of India dedicated the carrier to the country.

On 8 December 2015, Indian Defence-Ministry sources stated that the INS Vikramaditya would receive its first major overhaul in September 2016 as part of the "Make in India" initiative. The state-owned Cochin Shipyards and the Pipavav shipyards will overhaul the carrier once she is in dry dock.

In September 2016, Vikramaditya was dry-docked in Kochi for a month-long refit by Cochin Shipyards; the refit was completed in November, a month ahead of schedule.

A State Bank of India ATM was opened onboard Vikramaditya on 21 January 2017, making her the first Indian Navy ship to have an ATM.

In January 2020, Vikramaditya was used to undertake the first carrier trials of the naval version of the HAL Tejas Light Combat Aircraft. Over eight to ten days, the Tejas was launched and recovered several times as part of the aircraft's initial test phase. The Tejas was the first indigenous Indian aircraft to both land on and take off from an Indian aircraft carrier.

The expected official life of INS Vikramaditya is 40 years.

 Commanding officers 

 Affiliations 

On 17 January 2018, Vikramaditya was ceremonially affiliated to the following formations: 
 Bihar Regiment 
 No. 6 Squadron IAF

 Accidents and incidents 
On 10 June 2016, while undergoing a scheduled major refit of INS Vikramaditya, two people were killed by a toxic gas leak that occurred during maintenance work in the Sewage Treatment Plant compartment of INS Vikramaditya at Karwar. Two other people were injured and taken to the naval hospital.

On 28 February 2017, a MiG-29K aircraft that took off from Vikramaditya had to make an emergency landing at Mangalore International Airport due to hydraulic failure.

On 26 April 2019, one naval officer died of smoke inhalation at Karwar's naval hospital INHS Patanjali, and seven others were injured after fighting a fire that erupted in the boiler room of Vikramaditya'' on her course to INS Kadamba.

A MiG 29KUB disembarking from INS Vikramaditya enroute to INS Hansa crashed in the sea on 26 November 2020, resulting in the death of a pilot, Commander Nishant Singh.

On 20 July 2022, a fire broke out during a planned sortie for conducting sea trials off Karwar in the Uttar Kannada district of Karnataka. No casualties were reported.

See also
List of active Indian Navy ships
List of aircraft carriers in service
List of naval ship classes in service
Carrier battle groups of India
 – also originally laid down for the Soviet Navy.

INS Vishal

Notes

References

Sources

External links

Video: INS vikramaditya hits water
Defense Industry Daily – INS Vikramaditya Hits Delay, Cost Increases. Covers the program's full history, the ship's aerial complement, and associated events.
INS Vikramaditya – Bharat Rakshak
Photos, models & information at Worldwide Aircraft Carriers 
Satellite Photo of INS VIKRAMADITYA in Severodvinsk from the Google Maps
INS VIKRAMADITYA on World-wide Aircraft Carriers 

1982 ships
Aircraft carriers of India
India–Russia relations
Kiev-class aircraft carriers of the Indian Navy
Memorials to Vikramaditya
Ships built at the Black Sea Shipyard
Ships built in the Soviet Union